Heroes & Icons (H&I) is an American diginet television network owned by Weigel Broadcasting. Usually carried on the digital subchannels of its affiliated television station in most markets, the network airs classic television series from the 1950s through the 2000s, with a focus on action/adventure, westerns, crime dramas, sci-fi, and superhero programming.

H&I operates from Weigel Broadcasting's headquarters on North Halsted Street in Chicago, Illinois, and is essentially an offshoot of MeTV  – the general classic TV digital networks also owned by Weigel.

History
Heroes & Icons was soft-launched with limited advanced promotion on September 28, 2014, as a diginet of Weigel-owned stations WWME-CD (channel 23.2) and WCIU-TV (channel 26.4) in Chicago, and WMLW-TV (channel 49.3) in Milwaukee. Heroes & Icons was created at the request of the affiliates of Weigel's existing networks, to increase their programming options.

The network also launched in the South Bend, Indiana market, along with the major cable providers in the Chicago and Milwaukee markets (including Comcast Xfinity, RCN and Time Warner Cable) using existing carriage. Weigel opted to soft launch H&I in order to fine-tune its schedule, along with adding additional programming to the fledgling network. With the network having settled on a more stabilized schedule, Weigel moved the Heroes & Icons affiliation in Milwaukee to the third subchannel of CBS affiliate WDJT-TV (channel 58) on March 5, 2015, with This TV – which previously occupied the 58.3 space – moving to WMLW-DT3 in its place. Fox Television Stations expanded its relationship with Weigel beyond Movies!, adding it to eleven of their stations in the fourth quarter of 2015. A list of 2019 Nielsen ratings published by Variety indicated that Heroes & Icons averaged 196,000 viewers in prime time, up 18% from the 2018 average.

Programming
H&I's program schedule features a mix of police procedurals, westerns, science fiction, superhero and action/adventure-themed programs.  The network also carries a three-hour block of children's programming on Sunday mornings to fulfill FCC mandated E/I obligations.

Since 2016, a prominent staple in H&I's lineup is the airing of five live action classic Star Trek series (The Original Series, Next Generation, Deep Space Nine, Voyager, and Enterprise) Sunday through Friday evenings.

Weekdays feature a western block in the morning, followed by the "Day Shift" binge block of various police/legal procedurals, dramas, and action/adventure shows through the afternoon (a different show every day), a two-hour block of Walker, Texas Ranger early evenings, the Star Trek block in primetime, and a two-hour Baywatch block late nights.

A military block airs Saturday nights, with war themed programs such as Black Sheep Squadron, Combat!, Rat Patrol, and Tour of Duty 

Sunday mornings feature a superhero block, with programs such as The Adventures of Superman, Batman,  and Wonder Woman.

Affiliates
, Heroes & Icons has current affiliation agreements with television stations in 63 media markets encompassing 33 states, covering 69.21% of the United States. The network is carried on the digital subchannels of television stations in most of its markets (with current exceptions including St. George, Utah O&O KCSG, which has widespread cable and satellite coverage in the Salt Lake City market and throughout Utah, and Evansville, Indiana affiliate WTSN-CD, which both carry the network on their primary digital channels). The network is also carried on cable television providers through their digital tiers at the discretion of the affiliate's parent station in certain markets, and in 2020, Heroes & Icons is available nationwide on DISH Network channel 293.

In South Bend, Indiana, where Weigel Broadcasting owns three television stations (ABC affiliate WBND-LD, CW affiliate WCWW-LD and MyNetworkTV affiliate WMYS-LD), the network is instead carried by former Fox affiliate WSJV through an agreement with that station's owner Gray Television (it took over the main signal on October 1, 2016, as that station was under consideration to sell its spectrum in that year's spectrum auction, though it ultimately remained on the air). The network added additional stations by early December 2014, which in addition to WSJV, included KCSG in the Salt Lake City market (a station Weigel eventually purchased in 2017) and a digital subchannel of Des Moines CBS affiliate KCCI.

On September 18, 2015, Weigel signed an affiliation agreement with Fox Television Stations to carry the network on subchannels of the group's Fox and MyNetworkTV owned-and-operated stations in eleven markets, including New York City, Los Angeles, Dallas, San Francisco, and Washington, D.C., beginning in the fourth quarter of 2015. Once all of the stations involved in the agreement affiliated with the network, H&I will expand its coverage to 52% of all U.S. households and availability in eight of the 10 largest Nielsen markets. Weigel also maintains a secondary agreement with Spectrum to carry the network nationwide on that cable service, slotting the network's national feed on systems where a terrestrial affiliate does not exist or is not under contract to be carried.

In October 2020, Heroes & Icons was made available on Sling TV. On April 19, 2022, Heroes & Icons began airing on the Frndly TV live streaming service. On August 9, 2022, Heroes & Icons became available on Philo.

Current affiliates

Former affiliates

References

External links
 

Television networks in the United States
Classic television networks
Nostalgia television in the United States
Men's interest channels
Television channels and stations established in 2014
English-language television stations in the United States
Heroes and Icons
Weigel Broadcasting